The Obi mosaic-tailed rat (Melomys obiensis) is a species of rodent in the family Muridae.
It is found only in Indonesia.

References

Melomys
Mammals of Indonesia
Mammals described in 1911
Taxonomy articles created by Polbot
Taxa named by Oldfield Thomas